Uncorked is a Hallmark Channel television film starring Julie Benz that premiered on July 28, 2009 in the United Kingdom and aired in the United States on March 6, 2010.

Plot
Johnny (Julie Benz) is a high-powered executive who is definitely not looking to fall in love but when a business conference takes her to wine country she meets a handsome widower Andrew (Scott Elrod) who invites Johnny to meet his family after she loses her job. In helping his parents' winery she begins to fall in love with him and his family but when she gets offered another job she has to choose between her career or Andrew.

Cast
 Julie Benz as Johnetta "Johnny" Prentiss
 JoBeth Williams as Sophia
 Elliott Gould as Paul
 Scott Elrod as Andrew
 Gattlin Griffith as  Luke
 David Andriole as Christopher
 Anne-Marie Johnson as Debra
 Brittany Ishibashi as Renee
 Bruce Nozick as Thomas
 Jo Champa as Heidi
 Richard Fancy as Milton
 Ron Harper as Reverend Whitting
 Vincent De Paul as George (uncredited)

References

External links
 

2009 television films
2009 films
2009 romance films
Films directed by David S. Cass Sr.
Hallmark Channel original films
Films about wine
American romance films
2000s English-language films
2000s American films